Kollaborationz. is the second independent album by rapper Mr. Envi'. It was released on November 27, 2012.

Track listing

Pretendas (featuring JTL) — 3:20
What They Want (featuring J.B. & JTL) — 3:01
Don't Wait (featuring JTL) — 3:30
Show Ya Money (featuring JTL) — 2:28
Let It Be Known (featuring JTL & Blade) — 3:50
Just Chill (featuring JTL, CornBread & J.B.) — 3:25
Close Ya Mouth (featuring Mista Bush) — 3:25
Keep It Poppin' (featuring S.G.) — 4:16
What They Want (REMIX) (featuring JTL, J.B., CornBread & S.G.) — 4:31

References

External links 

2012 albums
Mr. Envi' albums
Self-released albums